KAJ may refer to:

 KAJJ-CD, TV station known as KAJ,  Kalispell, Montana, US
 Khal Adath Jeshurun (Washington Heights, Manhattan), a synagogue in New York City
 Kareem Abdul-Jabbar, former American professional basketball player

See also

 Kaj (disambiguation)